Photorhizobium thompsonianum is a bacterium from the genus of Photorhizobium.

References

Nitrobacteraceae